Richard Roe Bellis (who was born on April 3, 1946 in Pasadena, California) is an American film and television music composer, former CLGA president, former ATAS governor, USC lecturer, musical director and former actor. He composed the music for the 49th Star Trek Deep Space Nine episode "The House of Quark" and the 1990 two-part supernatural horror and dark fantasy television miniseries Stephen King's It. He has worked with Walt Disney Imagineering to write the music to the Disney's Animal Kingdom attraction "Countdown to Extinction" (later renamed to "Dinosaur"). Bellis attended John Muir High School from which he graduated in 1964. He became a musical director for traveling acts like Connie Stevens and Sally Struthers. For many years, he has directed the ASCAP Film Scoring Workshop.

External links

Music by Richard Bellis

1946 births
American male child actors
American television composers
John Muir High School alumni
Living people
Male television composers
People from Pasadena, California